Runcorn Urban District was an urban district centred around the town of Runcorn in Cheshire, England from 1894 until 1974.

The district was abolished in 1974 under the Local Government Act 1972 when it merged with the Municipal Borough of Widnes and parts of Runcorn Rural District and Whiston Rural District to form the Borough of Halton.

References

External links
http://www.ukbmd.org.uk/genuki/chs/runcorn.html

Districts of England created by the Local Government Act 1894
Districts of England abolished by the Local Government Act 1972
History of Cheshire
Urban districts of England
Former districts of Cheshire
Runcorn